Yuriy Syvukha (born 13 January 1958) is a former football goalkeeper and a current goalkeeping coach.

Syvukha began his coaching career as a goalkeepers coach. In January 2013 he was appointed as a goalkeeping coach in the Ukraine national football team.

Awards and honours
Awards
 USSR Premier League runner-up: 1978
 USSR Cup: 1978, 1988

Individual honours
 Ukrainian Footballer of the Year: 1992, 1992–1993

External links
 Profile at football.ua 
 Profile at Official FFU Site

References

1958 births
Living people
Ukrainian footballers
Soviet footballers
FC Metalist Kharkiv players
FC Metalurh Zaporizhzhia players
FC Dynamo Kyiv players
FC Torpedo Zaporizhzhia players
FC Zirka Kropyvnytskyi players
Ukrainian Premier League players
Ukrainian football managers
Association football goalkeepers
Soviet Union youth international footballers
Sportspeople from Kharkiv Oblast